Kwaku Aning (born in 1946) is a Ghanaian diplomat, international civil servant and technologist who is Chairman of the governing board of the Ghana Atomic Energy Commission, having been appointed in July 2017. Aning is a former Deputy Director-General of the International Atomic Energy Agency.
 
As Deputy Director General, he was head of the Department of Technical Cooperation at the International Atomic Energy Agency, an international agency under the auspices of the United Nations. He took up his position on January 1, 2010 and ended in June, 2015.

Prior to his appointment as Deputy Director-General, he served as the Director and Secretary of the Policy Making Organs of the IAEA. He has also been the Representative of the IAEA Director General to the United Nations. He is a member of the board of trustees of Kuwait's Al-Sumait Prize for African Development. 
 
In September 2015, Aning became a Governor of IAEA Board of Governors and still serves in this position.

Early life and education
Aning was born in 1946 in Ghana. He was educated at Accra Academy. Aning completed a bachelor's degree in mechanical engineering in 1968 from the University of Science and Technology, graduating with first class honours, as one of the first four persons to obtain first class honours in the Engineering Sciences from the university. That same year, he entered Princeton University receiving a Masters in Solid State Physics in 1971. Aning obtained a doctoral degree in metallurgy from Columbia University in 1976.

Career
Aning started his working career as a Technical Advisor to the UN Conference on Science and Technology for Development. In January 1980, Aning became a Senior Scientific Affairs Officer of the UN Centre for Science and Technology, remaining in this position for the next twelve years. He worked in this role which had a special focus on science and technology development of developing countries. Aning moved on to the UN Peacekeeping Department, working as a Regional Election Officer for the period between March 1992 to June 1994 . Aning was made a Senior Officer, Office of the Secretary-General later on within August 1998 and January 2000.

In February 2000, Kwaku Aning joined the International Atomic Energy Agency as the Representative of the Director General of the agency to the United Nations in New York.

Aning is the Chairman of the Nuclear Power Institute, GAEC. Aning is also Chairman of the Governing Board, Ghana Atomic Energy Commission.

Family and personal life
Aning married Arafua Apaloo-Aning, a political activist and keen gardener

External links

References

Place of birth missing (living people)
1946 births
Living people
Ghanaian engineers
Ghanaian physicists
International Atomic Energy Agency officials
Alumni of the Accra Academy
Columbia School of Engineering and Applied Science alumni
Kwame Nkrumah University of Science and Technology alumni
Princeton University alumni